A wind quintet, also known as a woodwind quintet, is a group of five wind players (most commonly flute, oboe, clarinet, French horn and bassoon).

Unlike the string quartet (of 4 string instruments) with its homogeneous blend of sound color, the instruments in a wind quintet differ from each other considerably in technique, idiom, and timbre. The modern wind quintet sprang from the octet ensemble favored in the court of Joseph II in late 18th century Vienna: two oboes, two clarinets, two (natural) horns, and two bassoons. The influence of Haydn's chamber writing suggested similar possibilities for winds, and advances in the building of these instruments in that period made them more useful in small ensemble settings, leading composers to attempt smaller combinations.

It was Anton Reicha's twenty-four quintets, begun in 1811, and the nine quintets of Franz Danzi that established the genre, and their pieces are still standards of the repertoire. Though the form fell out of favor in the latter half of the 19th century, there has been renewed interest in the form by leading composers in the 20th century, and today the wind quintet is a standard chamber ensemble, valued for its versatility and variety of tone color.

Notable wind quintet composers

Eighteenth century
Antonio Rosetti (ca. 1750–1792) One quintet, for flute, oboe, English horn, clarinet, and bassoon

Nineteenth century 
Johann Georg Albrechtsberger (1736–1809), a quintet for two oboes, clarinet, natural horn, and bassoon
Giuseppe Cambini (1746–1825), three quintets
Franz Danzi (1763–1826), nine quintets
Johann Georg Lickl (1769–1843), one quintet
Anton Reicha (1770–1836), twenty-four quintets, as well as some independent movements
George Onslow (1784–1853), one quintet, op. 81
Giulio Briccialdi (1818–1881), three quintets
Paul Taffanel (1844–1908), one quintet
August Klughardt (1847–1902), one quintet

Twentieth century 

Guy Ropartz (1864–1955), one quintet
Carl Nielsen (1865–1931), one quintet
Gustav Holst (1874–1934), one quintet
Arnold Schoenberg (1874–1951), one quintet
Theodor Blumer (1881–1964), four quintets
Percy Grainger (1882–1961), two quintets
Wallingford Riegger (1885–1961), one quintet
Heitor Villa-Lobos (1887–1959), one quintet
Jacques Ibert (1890–1962), one quintet
Hendrik Andriessen (1892–1981), one quintet
Darius Milhaud (1892–1974), one quintet
Walter Piston (1894–1976), one quintet
Paul Hindemith (1895–1963), one quintet
Roberto Gerhard (1896–1970), one quintet
Carlos Chávez (1899–1978), one quintet
Ernst Krenek (1900–1991), two quintets
Ruth Crawford-Seeger (1901–1953), one quintet
Claude Arrieu (1903–1990), one quintet
Ferenc Farkas (1905–2000), one quintet
Mátyás Seiber (1905–1960), one quintet
Jaroslav Ježek (1906–1942), one quintet
Alec Wilder (1907–1980), twelve quintets
Otto Mortensen (1907–1986), one quintet
György Ránki (1907–1992), one quintet
Elliott Carter (1908–2012), two quintets
Vagn Holmboe (1909–1996), one quintet
Ljubica Maric (1909–2003), one quintet
Samuel Barber (1910–1981), one quintet
Josef Tal (1910–2008), one quintet
Jean Françaix (1912–1997), two quintets
Ingolf Dahl (1912–1970), one quintet
Alvin Etler (1913–1973), two quintets, a concerto for quintet and orchestra, and a concerto for violin and wind quintet
Vivian Fine (1913–2000), one quintet
Irving Fine (1914–1962), two quintets
George Perle (1915–2009), four quintets
Vincent Persichetti (1915–1987), two quintets
Dinu Lipatti (1917–1950), one quintet and six transcriptions of Scarlatti sonatas for wind quintet
Peter Racine Fricker (1920–1990), one quintet
Witold Silewicz (1921–2007), at least one quintet, esp. Happy Birthday to You.
Malcolm Arnold (1921–2006), two quintets
Harry Freedman (1922–2005), three quintets, one with narrator
György Ligeti (1923–2006), two quintets
Milko Kelemen (born 1924), one quintet
Jurriaan Andriessen (1925–1996), one quintet
Luciano Berio (1925–2003), four quintets
Włodzimierz Kotoński (1925–2014), one quintet
Barney Childs (1926–2000), one quintet
Hans Werner Henze (1926–2012), one quintet
Lee Hoiby (1926–2011), one quintet
Gottfried Michael Koenig (born 1926), one quintet
Franco Donatoni (1927–2000), one quintet
Wayne Peterson (1927–2021), one quintet and five transcriptions of other composers' works
Jean-Michel Damase (1928–2013), one quintet
Frigyes Hidas (1928–2007), three quintets
Karlheinz Stockhausen (1928–2007), three quintets
Donald Martino (1931–2005), one quintet
Per Nørgård (born 1932), one quintet
Ramiro Cortés (1933–1984), one quintet
István Láng (born 1933), three quintets
Harrison Birtwistle (1934–2022), two quintets
Rob du Bois (1934–2013), two quintets
Peter Schat (1935–2003), one quintet
David Del Tredici (born 1937), one quintet
Charles Wuorinen (born 1938), one quintet
Frank Zappa (1940–1993), two quintets
Friedrich Goldmann (1941–2009), one quintet, and a sonata for wind quintet with piano
Michael Kibbe (born 1945) 15 quintets, 3 quintet and Piano, 1 quintet and cello
Martin Bresnick (born 1946), one quintet
Richard St. Clair (born 1946), one quintet
Jack Gallagher (born 1947), one quintet
Stephen Brown (born 1948), one quintet
Robert Beaser (born 1954), one quintet
Eric Ewazen (born 1954), one quintet plus one concerto for quintet with orchestra or piano
David A. Jaffe (born 1955), one quintet
Luca Francesconi (born 1956), two quintets
Kenneth Fuchs (born 1956), two quintets
 Oleksandr Shchetynsky (born 1960), one quintet
William Susman (born 1960), one quintet
Karlheinz Essl (born 1960), one quintet
Ludmila Yurina (born 1962), one quintet
Juan María Solare (born 1966), four quintets
Peter Fribbins (born 1969), one quintet
Lior Navok (born 1971), one quintet, and a double quintet that would belong in the 21st-century list

Twenty-first century
Yoav Talmi (born 1943), one quintet
John Zorn (born 1953) one quintet
Michael Gilbertson (born 1987) concerto for quintet with orchestral
Nigel Keay (born 1955), one quintet
Shigeru Kan-no (born 1959), no quintets, but there is one work combining wind and brass quintets with brass orchestra
Ananda Sukarlan (born 1968) piece for piano & wind quintet
James Francis Brown (born 1969), one quintet 
Robert Paterson (born 1970), one quintet
Emily Doolittle (born 1972), one quintet, and one work for narrator and quintet
Mohammed Fairouz (born 1985), one quintet
Alex Weiser (born 1989), one quintet
Cris Derksen, one quintet
Valerie Coleman
Sean Friar, one quintet
Yalil Guerra, (born 1973, Cuba), one quintet titled "Las Musas de San Alejandro"
Shai Cohen (born 1968), "STYX V+1" For wind quintet and vibraphone

Notable wind quintet repertoire 
Andriessen, Jurriaan, Sciarada Spagnuola [Spanish Charade] (1963)
Arnold, Malcolm, Three Shanties, op. 4 (1943)
Bach, Jan, Skizzen, Highgate Press [Sketches, Highgate Press] (1983)
Barber, Samuel, Summer Music, op. 31 (1955)
Baur, Jürg, Quintetto sereno [Serene Quintet] (1957–58)
Beaser, Robert, Shadow and Light (1981)
Bennett, Richard R., Concerto for Woodwind Quintet
Berio, Luciano
Ricorrenze (1987)
Wind Quintet (1948)
Wind Quintet (1950)
Opus Number Zoo (arr. 1951 for wind quintet, from the 1950 original for 2 clarinets and 2 horns)
Birtwistle, Harrison
Refrains and Choruses (1957)
Five Distances (1992)
Bloch, Waldemar, Serenade (1966)
Blumer, Theodor, Serenade, Theme and Variations
Bobescu, Constantin, Parafrază pe motivul "Horei Staccato" (1958)
Bois, Rob du
Chants et contrepoints (1962)
Réflexions sur le jour où Pérotin le Grand ressuscitera (1969)
Bottje, Will Gay, Diversions, for quintet, narrator and piano; text by James Thurber (1994)
Bozza, Eugene
Variations sur un thème libre, op. 42 (1943)
Scherzo, op. 48 (1944)
Pentaphonie (1969)
Quand les muses collaborent
Bresnick, Martin
Just Time (1985)
Willie's Way (2006, quintet arrangement by Richard Mathias 2011)
Brown, Stephen, Suite for Woodwinds, (1982, revised 2006)
Buss, Howard J., Five Stars (2004)
Cambini, Giuseppe Maria, Trois quintetti concertans [Three Concertante Quintets] (ca. 1802)
Quintet no. 1 in B-flat major
Quintet no. 2 in D minor
Quintet no. 3 in F major
Carter, Elliott
Nine by Five (2009)
Quintet (1948)
Chávez, Carlos, Soli no. 2 (1961)
Cortés, Ramiro, Three Movements for Five Winds (1967–68)
Dahl, Ingolf, Allegro and Arioso
Damase, 17 Variations op. 22, (1951)
Danzi, Franz, 9 Quintets:
op. 56, no. 1 in B-flat major
op. 56, no. 2 in G minor
op. 56, no. 3 in F major
op. 67, no. 1 in G major
op. 67, no. 2 in E minor
op. 67, no. 3 in E-flat major
op. 68, no. 1 in A minor
op. 68, no. 2 in F major
op. 68, no. 3 in D minor
Del Tredici, David, Belgian Bliss (2011)
Franco Donatoni Blow (1989)
Dubois, Pierre Max, Fantasia (1956)
Etler, Alvin
Concerto for Violin and Wind Quintet (1958)
Concerto for Wind Quintet and Orchestra (1960)
Quintet no. 1 (1955)
Quintet no. 2 (1957)
Farkas, Ferenc
Régi magyar táncok a XVII. századból (aka Antiche danze ungheresi del 17. secolo) [Old Hungarian Dances from the 17th century] (1959)
Lavottiana (1968)
Fine, Irving
Partita (1948)
Romanza (1958)
Fine, Vivian, Dancing Winds (1987)
Françaix, Jean
Quintette à vent [Wind Quintet] no. 1 (1948)
Quintette à vent [Wind Quintet] no. 2 (1987)
Friar, Sean
Short Winds, for wind quintet (2010)
Gallagher, Jack, Ancient Evenings and Distant Music (1971)
Genzmer, Harald
Bläserquintett [Wind Quintet] no. 1 (1957)
Bläserquintett [Wind Quintet] no. 2 (1970)
Goeb, Roger
Prairie Songs (1947)
Wind Quintet No. 1 (1949)
Wind Quintet No. 2 (1955)
Wind Quintet No. 3 (1980)
Wind Quintet No. 4 (1982)
Goldmann, Friedrich
Bläserquintett [Wind Quintet] (1991)
Sing' Lessing, for baritone, wind quintet, and piano (1978)
Sonata for Wind Quintet and Piano (1969)
Zusammenstellung, for wind quintet (1976)
Hall, Pauline
Suite for Wind Quintet (1948)
Quintet, Lyche (1952)
Harbison, John, Wind Quintet (1979)
Heiden, Bernhard
Intrada in B-flat major op. 56, for Quintet and alto saxophone (1970)
Sinfonia (1949)
Woodwind Quintet (1965)
Hidas, Frigyes
Fúvósötös [Wind Quintet] no. 2 (1969)
Fúvósötös [Wind Quintet] no. 3 (1979)
Hindemith, Paul, Kleine Kammermusik [Little Chamber Music], op. 24, no. 2 (1923)
Hoiby, Lee, Diversions for Wind Quintet (1999)
Holst, Gustav, Wind Quintet in A flat, op. 14 (1903)
Ibert, Jacques, Trois Pièces Brèves [Three Short Pieces]
Jacob, Gordon
Suite for Wind Quintet, unpublished
Sextet for piano and wind quintet (1956)
Kelemen, Milko
Études contrapuntiques [Contrapuntal Etudes] (1959)
Entrances for wind quintet (1966)
Klughardt, August, Quintet op. 79
Koenig, Gottfried Michael, Bläserquintett [Wind Quintet], for flute, oboe, English horn, clarinet, and bassoon (1958–59)
Kotoński, Włodzimierz, Kwintet na instrumenty dęte [Wind Quintet] (1964)
Kurtág, György, Fúvósötös [Wind Quintet], op. 2 (1959)
Láng, István
Fúvósötös [Wind Quintet] no. 1 (1964)
Fúvósötös [Wind Quintet] no. 2 (1965)
Fúvósötös [Wind Quintet] no. 3 (1975)
Ligeti, György
Sechs Bagatellen [6 Bagatelles] (1953, arr. from Musica ricercata)
10 Stücke [10 Pieces], for alto flute (doubling flute and piccolo), English horn (doubling oboe d'amore, oboe), clarinet, horn, and bassoon (1968)
Maslanka, David
Quintet for Winds No. 1
Quintet for Winds No. 2
Quintet for Winds No. 3
Quintet for Winds No. 4
Marić, Ljubica, Duvački kvintet [Wind Quintet] (1931)
Mathias, William, Wind Quintet, op. 22 (1963)
Milhaud, Darius, La Cheminée du roi René [King René's Fireplace]
Mortensen, Otto, Quintette pour Flûte, Hautbois, Clarinette, Cor et Basson (1944)
Navok, Lior
Six Short Stories for Woodwind Quintet
The Adventures of Pinocchio (for three actors / speakers, wind quintet and piano)
Tetris – for double wind quintet
Nielsen, Carl, Wind Quintet (1922)
Nørgård, Per, Whirl's World (1970)
Oteri, Frank J., circles mostly in wood, a wind quintet in quartertones (2002)
Paterson, Robert, Wind Quintet (2004)
Patterson, Paul
Comedy for Five Winds (1972)
Westerly Winds (1998)
Perle, George
For Piano and Wind, for flute, English horn, clarinet, horn, bassoon, and piano (1988)
Wind Quintet no. 1 (1959)
Wind Quintet no. 2 (1960)
Wind Quintet no. 3 (1967)
Wind Quintet no. 4 (1984), winner of the 1986 Pulitzer Prize for Music
Persichetti, Vincent
Pastoral, op.21 (1943)
King Lear, op.35, for wind quintet, timpani, and piano (1948)
Peterson, Wayne, Metamorphosis (1967)
Piazzolla, Astor, Milonga sin palabras [Milonga without words]
Pierné, Paul, Suite pittoresque [Picturesque Suite]
Pilss, Carl, Serenade in G Major
Piston, Walter, Wind Quintet (1956)
Poulenc, Sextet, for wind quintet and piano (1932–39)
Ránki, György, Pentaerophonia
Reicha, Anton
Twenty-four Wind Quintets, Opp. 88, 91, 99, and 100 (1810–20)
Riegger, Wallingford, Concerto, op. 53, for wind quintet and piano (1956)
Rosowsky, Solomon
"Moshe der Shuster" (Moshe the Cobbler) (1917)
"Nigun ohne a Sof" (Melody without an End) (1917)
Schat, Peter, Improvisations and Symphonies, op. 11 (1960)
Schönberg, Arnold, Bläserquintett [Wind Quintet], op. 26 (1923–24)
Schulze, Werner, Explosioni
Seiber, Mátyás, Permutazioni a Cinque for wind quintet (1958)
Solare, Juan María
Extraños preludios y doble canon (Strange preludes and double canon) (1992)
Nómade (adaptation of the piece originally for piano solo) (2002–2006)
Ölflecke auf dem Wasser (Oil spots on the water) (2003)
Born equal (2011)
Stockhausen, Karlheinz
Zeitmaße [Time-measures], for flute, oboe, English horn, clarinet, and bassoon (1955–56)
Adieu, für Wolfgang Sebastian Meyer (1966)
Rotary Wind Quintet (1997)
Sukarlan, Ananda, "Mozart Meandering through Java before Bumping into Beethoven in Boston" for piano & wind quintet, written for the winds of Boston Symphony Orchestra. He also wrote 5 individual pieces for each wind instrument with piano, based on Ovid's "Metamorphosis", written for those members of BSO
Susman, William, Six Minutes Thirty Seconds (1995)
Taffanel, Paul, Quintet for Wind Instruments
Tal, Josef, Wind Quintet (1966)
Thuille, Ludwig, Sextet for Wind Instruments and Piano
Tomasi, Henri, Cinq Danses [Five Dances]
Villa-Lobos, Heitor, Quinteto (em forma de chôros) [Quintet in the Form of a Chôros], for flute, oboe, English horn, clarinet, and bassoon (1928; arr. for the conventional quintet 1951)
Weiser, Alex, Wind (2013)
Wuorinen, Charles, Wind Quintet (1977)
Yurina, Ludmila, Geometricum (1993)

Notable wind quintets 
 Artecombo
 Bergen Woodwind Quintet
 Danzi Quintet
 Dorian Wind Quintet
 
 Imani Winds (Grammy nominated 2006)
 
 New London Chamber Ensemble
 New York Woodwind Quintet
 
 Quintet of the Americas
 Soni Ventorum Wind Quintet
 Vancouver Woodwind Quintet
 Vento Chiaro

References

Further reading
 Barrenechea, Sérgio Azra. 2004. "O Quinteto de Sopros" (Dica Técnica 81) Parts 1 and 2. Revista Weril 150 and 151.

 Hošek, Miroslav. 1979. Das Bläserquintett. Grünwald: B. Brüchle. .
 Kohl, Jerome. 2017. Karlheinz Stockhausen: Zeitmaße. Landmarks in Music Since 1950, edited by Wyndham Thomas. Abingdon, Oxon; London; New York: Routledge. .
 Leyden, Megan C. 2000. "The Story of the Soni Ventorum Wind Quintet". DMA thesis. Seattle: University of Washington.
 Moeck, Karen. 1977. "The Beginnings of the Woodwind Quintet." NACWPI Journal 26, no. 2 (November): 22–33.
 Secrist-Schmedes, Barbera. 2002. Wind Chamber Music for Two to Sixteen Winds: An Annotated Guide. Lanham, Maryland.: Scarecrow Press. .

External links
IDRS Survey of wind quintet literature

Chamber music
Types of musical groups